Grounds for divorce are regulations specifying the circumstances under which a person will be granted a divorce.

Grounds for divorce or Grounds for Divorce may also refer to:

Grounds for divorce (United States), regulations for divorce specific to the United States
Grounds for Divorce (1925 film), an American comedy silent film
Grounds for Divorce (1960 film), a West German romantic comedy film 
"Grounds for Divorce" (song), song by band Elbow

See also